Tom Perchard (born 1976, Canterbury, England) is a writer and musicologist. He is the author of Lee Morgan: His Life, Music, and Culture (Equinox, 2006), the first biography of the jazz trumpeter Lee Morgan (1938–72). His other works include After Django: Making Jazz in Postwar France (University of Michigan Press, 2015). His work is concerned with the historical and cultural situation of music-making and listening, focussing specifically on American jazz in the mid-20th century. Since 2009, Perchard has been a lecturer in the Department of Music at Goldsmiths College. He has also taught at University of Westminster. He is a contributor to The Wire.

References

External links 
 

1976 births
Living people
Academics of the University of Westminster
English musicologists
English music journalists
People from Canterbury
The Wire (magazine) writers